Chesapeake Bay Academy (founded in 1989) in  Virginia Beach, Virginia is an educational institution that educates and guides students with learning disabilities, including attention disorders (ADHD), dyslexia, and dysgraphia.

References
Chesapeake Bay Academy: School Website

Private K-12 schools in Virginia
Educational institutions established in 1989
Schools in Virginia Beach, Virginia
1989 establishments in Virginia